ROX is a British jewellers, established in 2002 by Kyron Keogh and Grant Mitchell, that specialises in diamonds and luxury watches – stocking brands such as Hublot, Chopard, Bulgari, Roger Dubuis, Zenith (watchmaker), Tag Heuer, Tudor, Gucci and Jacob & Co. ROX currently operates eight stores across Scotland and England - in Edinburgh, Glasgow, London, Liverpool, Newcastle upon Tyne and Leeds - with an expected turnover in excess of £20m in 2022.

Awards 
Retailer of the Year, Scottish Fashion Awards in 2011.
Independent Jeweller of the Year, UK Jewellery Awards 2011.

References

External links

Jewellery retailers of the United Kingdom
British companies established in 2002
Retail companies established in 2002
Internet properties established in 2002
Online retailers of the United Kingdom
British jewellers
Scottish jewellers